Richard Earl DeVor (1944–2011) was a College of Engineering Distinguished Professor of Manufacturing and research professor at the University of Illinois at Urbana-Champaign. His research interests consist of mathematical modeling/simulation of material removal processes and mathematical modeling of the end milling/face milling processes. He attained his PhD at the University of Wisconsin-Madison. He died in July 2011.

References

External links
 First - Manufacturing Leadership Symposium.

2011 deaths
21st-century American engineers
University of Illinois Urbana-Champaign faculty
1944 births